Gorton railway station serves Gorton district of the city of Manchester, England.

It was opened by the Great Central Railway (GCR) on 25 August 1906 and replaced an earlier station that opened on the line on 23 May 1842. From 1 January 1923, the station was operated by the London and North Eastern Railway (LNER). The new station was on the busy Woodhead Route to Sheffield Victoria and had four platforms. From its opening, the new station was named Gorton and Openshaw, and it reverted to its original name by 1977. It was referred to as Openshaw in the 1964 song "Slow Train" by Flanders and Swann. Only two platforms now remain in use.

Facilities
The station has a ticket office, which is staffed on a part-time basis six days per week (06:25-13:30 weekdays, 07:00-14:10 Saturdays). At other times, tickets must be purchased in advance or on the train. There are no permanent buildings left at platform level other than basic waiting shelters. Train running information is offered via timetable posters, digital CIS displays and telephone. Step-free access is available to both platforms via ramps from the entrance and footbridge.

Services
Gorton is served by eastbound trains to Rose Hill Marple, Glossop and Hadfield, with all westbound services terminating at Manchester Piccadilly.

The majority of Monday to Friday daytime trains are serviced by the Rose Hill Marple diesel multiple unit service (twice an hour each way). Early morning, rush hour and late evening services operate to and from Glossop and Hadfield using Class 323 electric multiple units (as there is only a limited late evening service on the Rose Hill line).

On Saturday morning two services operate to/from Hadfield, and the evening services also operate to Hadfield. During the rest of the day services operate to/from Rose Hill Marple or Marple (hourly to each).
On Sundays, all trains operate to/from Hadfield.

References

External links

Railway stations in Manchester
DfT Category E stations
Former Great Central Railway stations
Northern franchise railway stations
Railway stations in Great Britain opened in 1842
1842 establishments in England